The dark-sided flycatcher (Muscicapa sibirica) is a small passerine bird belonging to the genus Muscicapa in the Old World flycatcher family Muscicapidae. It has a wide breeding distribution in the East Palearctic with northern birds migrating south for the winter. It is also known as the Siberian flycatcher or sooty flycatcher, the latter name is also used for the sooty flycatcher (M. infuscata) of Africa.

Description
It is 13 to 14 cm long. The upperparts are plain and dark grey-brown apart from a pale wingbar and pale edging to the tertial feathers. The breast and flanks have a variable amount of streaky dark grey-brown. This is unlike the similar Asian brown flycatcher which has rather plain pale underparts and the grey-streaked flycatcher which is white below with distinct grey streaks.

Dark-sided flycatchers have a pale submoustachial stripe and a dark malar stripe which outlines the white throat and half-collar. The centre of the lower breast and belly is white while the undertail-coverts are white with dark centres to the feathers. The bill is short and dark and the feet are black. The eye is large and has a whitish ring around it. The wings are long with a longer primary projection than the Asian brown flycatcher.

The adults of both sexes are alike but juveniles have pale spots on the upperparts, a mottled breast and buff tips to the wing-coverts.

The song is a series of thin, high-pitched notes with trills and whistles. The call is a metallic tinkling.

Distribution
The subspecies M. s. sibirica breeds in south-east Siberia westward to beyond Lake Baikal as well as in Mongolia, north-east China, North Korea and Japan (Hokkaidō and northern Honshū). M. s. rothschildi breeds in western China and Myanmar. M. s. gulmergi occurs from Afghanistan to Kashmir with M. s. cacabata from the eastern Himalayas to south-east Tibet and perhaps Myanmar.

The wintering range includes north-east India, Bangladesh, southern China, Taiwan and South-east Asia as far as Sumatra, Java, Borneo and the Philippines (Palawan and Culion). Vagrant birds have been recorded in Alaska, Iceland and Bermuda.

It inhabits coniferous and mixed forest and woodland and is sometimes seen in plantations, parks and gardens. It typically occurs in mountainous regions, reaching 4000 metres above sea-level in some areas.

Behaviour
Like other flycatchers, its feeding technique is to perch on an exposed branch and wait. When an insect flies past, the bird dashes out to snatch it.

It builds a cup-shaped nest 2 to 18 metres above the ground, on the branch of a tree or sometimes in a hole. Three to five eggs are laid; these are pale green with reddish markings.

References

Brazil, Mark A. (1991) The Birds of Japan, Christopher Helm, London.
Kennedy, Robert S.; Gonzales, Pedro C.; Dickinson, Edward C.; Miranda, Hector C. & Fisher, Timothy H. (2000) A Guide to the Birds of the Philippines, Oxford University Press, Oxford.
Lee, Woo-Shin, Koo, Tae-Hoe & Park, Jin-Young (2000) A Field Guide to the Birds of Korea, LG Evergreen Foundation, Seoul.
MacKinnon, John & Phillipps, Karen (2000) A Field Guide to the Birds of China. Oxford University Press, Oxford.
Robson, Craig (2002) A Field Guide to the Birds of South-East Asia. New Holland, London.

Further reading

Identification

External links

Oriental Bird Images: Dark-sided flycatcher

dark-sided flycatcher
Birds of Afghanistan
Birds of China
Birds of Northeast India
Birds of Japan
Birds of Manchuria
Birds of Mongolia
dark-sided flycatcher
dark-sided flycatcher